Osvajači (trans. Conquerors) were a Serbian and former Yugoslav hard rock/heavy metal band from Kragujevac.

Osvajači were originally formed in 1990. They recorded two studio albums, Krv i led and Sam, and disbanded in 1997. In 1998, former Osvajači vocalist Zvonko Pantović "Čipi" and keyboardist Nebojša Jakovljević formed the rock/pop/folk band Osvajači All Stars, which soon became known simply as Osvajači. In 1999, one of the original Osvajači members, guitarist Dragan Urošević, with a new band (which included former Osvajači member Saša Popović) released the album Vrelina under the name Osvajači. This album is widely considered by fans and critics the continuation of the original Osvajači work, which is not the case with the albums released by Pantović and Jakovljević during the 1999–2002 period. In 2005, Pantović, Jakovljević and Urošević reunited under the name Osvajači, ending the cooperation in 2009.

Band history

1990–1997
The band was formed in 1990 by Zvonko Pantović (vocals), Dragan Urošević (guitar), Saša Popović (bass guitar) and Miša Raca (drums). The keyboardist Laza Ristovski and the bass guitarist Dejan Dačović were also involved in the band's activity. Ristovski played keyboards on the recording and produced Osvajači debut album, and performed with the band on various occasions.

The band's debut album Krv i led (Blood and Ice), released through PGP-RTB in 1990, was mostly glam metal-oriented. In 1994, the band's song "Pronađi me" ("Find Me") was released on Komuna compilation album Pakleni vozači: Jugoslovenski hard rock (Hell Riders: Yugoslav Hard Rock). The band's second album Sam (Alone), released in 1995 through PGP-RTS, on which they were joined by the keyboardist Nebojša Jakovljević, marked the band's slight shift towards a heavier sound. After releasing a compilation album The Best Of in 1997, Osvajači disbanded.

After recording the song "Vino crveno" with band Prvi Čin, Zvonko Pantović formed the rock/pop/folk band All Stars Osvajači. Nebojša Jakovljević soon joined Pantović's new band. All Stars Osvajači continued to be typically referred to as just "Osvajači", which caused confusion among fans.

1999–2000
In 1999, Urošević, with Nenad Jovanović (vocals), Saša Popović (rhythm guitar), Saša Marković (bass guitar) and Nenad Branković "Konga" (drums), recorded the promo CD with songs "Samo ti" and "Minut ćutanja", and soon afterwards hard rock-oriented album Vrelina (Heat), released in 2000 through Take It Or Leave It Records under the name Osvajači. These releases are considered by fans and critics to be the continuation of the original Osvajači work, which is not the case with the albums released by Pantović and Jakovljević during the 1999–2002 period. This band, however, disbanded in 2000.

2005–2009

In 2005, Pantović, Urošević and Jakovljević reunited under the name Osvajači. They performed for several years, playing songs from Krv i led and Sam, but also the song "Minut ćutanja" previously recorded with Jovanović. The lineup, besides Pantović, Urošević and Jakovljević, featured the bass guitarist Mikica Zdravković (also a member of the punk rock band Čovek Bez Sluha) and the drummer Dejan Nikolić. The band announced the release of a new studio album, performing several new songs on their live appearances. However, Urošević decided to leave the band (Zdravković and Nikolić also leaving with him). Pantović and Jakovljević continued to perform as Osvajači (although the band is essentially a continuation of All Stars Osvajači, as it features the guitarist Bane Jelić, who was the third member of All Stars Osvajači). Urošević and Pantović formed the hard rock band Čipi & Industrija. Pantović currently cooperates with both Jakovljević and Urošević, and is the vocalist for both bands.

Legacy
In 2011, the song "Maska (Sam)" ("Mask (Alone)") was polled, by the listeners of Radio 202, one of 60 greatest songs released by PGP-RTB/PGP-RTS during the sixty years of the label's existence.

Discography

Studio albums
Krv i led (1991)
Sam (1995)
Vrelina (2000)

Compilations
The Best Of (1997)

Singles
"Samo ti" / "Minut ćutanja" (1999)

See also
All Stars Osvajači

References 

EX YU ROCK enciklopedija 1960–2006, Janjatović Petar;

External links
Osvajači at Discogs
Osvajači at Encyclopaedia Metallum

Serbian hard rock musical groups
Yugoslav hard rock musical groups
Serbian heavy metal musical groups
Yugoslav glam metal musical groups
Musical groups from Kragujevac
Musical groups established in 1990
Beovizija contestants